A. Cole (full name and dates of birth and death unknown) was an English cricketer.  Coles batting and bowling styles are unknown.  Indeed, almost next to nothing is known about Cole.

Cole made his first-class debut for Middlesex in 1879 against Yorkshire at Lord's.  He played one further game for Middlesex in that season against Oxford University and days later he appeared for a United London Eleven in a single first-class match against a United North of England Eleven.  In his 3 first-class matches, he scored 45 runs at a batting average of 7.50, with a high score of 21.  With the ball he took 3 wickets at a bowling average of 17.00, with best figures of 3/29.

It is known that Cole was a professional on the Marylebone Cricket Club staff, as well as playing a single match for Essex in 1880 against the Marylebone Cricket Club.  At this time Essex did not have first-class status.

References

External links
A. Cole at Cricinfo
A. Cole at CricketArchive

English cricketers of 1864 to 1889
Middlesex cricketers
Essex cricketers
Year of birth missing
Year of death missing
London United Eleven cricketers